Love Songs is a compilation album by R&B artist, Babyface that contains songs from his first four studio albums: Lovers (1986), Tender Lover (1989), For the Cool in You (1993), The Day (1996).

Track listing 
"I Said I Love You"
"All Day Thinkin'"
"This Is for the Lover in You" - Babyface, LL Cool J
"Lady, Lady"
"For the Cool in You"
"A Bit Old Fashioned"
"Never Keeping Secrets"
"When Can I See You"
"Whip Appeal"
"Soon as I Get Home"
"Given a Chance"
"Sunshine"
"Every Time I Close My Eyes" - Babyface, Kenny G, Mariah Carey
"When Your Body Gets Weak"
"Lovers"
"You Make Me Feel Brand New"

Babyface (musician) compilation albums
2001 compilation albums
Epic Records compilation albums